Madame X is a 1981 American made-for-television drama film directed by Robert Ellis Miller and starring Tuesday Weld. It is based on the 1908 play by French playwright Alexandre Bisson (1848-1912).

Plot
A woman is thrown out of her home by her mother-in-law and sinks into depravity. Twenty years later, she finds herself accused of murder for saving her daughter (it was her son in all other versions), who does not know who she is.

Cast
 Tuesday Weld as Holly Richardson
 Jeremy Brett as Dr. Terrence Keith
 Len Cariou as John Abbott
 Martina Deignan as Elizabeth Reeves
 Robert Hooks as Dist. Atty. Roerich
 Eleanor Parker as Katherine Richardson
 Jerry Stiller as Burt Orland
 Robin Strand as Willy Dwyer
 Granville Van Dusen as Clay Richardson
 Norman Bartold as Judge Tom Matlock
 Raleigh Bond as Captain Costa
 Stanley Brock as Arthur Penrose
 Camilla Carr as Kit
 Pola Miller as Bejay Matlock
 Tony Plana as Senor Rueda

See also
 List of American films of 1981
 Madame X

External links

1981 television films
1981 films
1981 drama films
American films based on plays
Films directed by Robert Ellis Miller
Films with screenplays by Edward Anhalt
NBC network original films
Universal Pictures films
American drama television films
1980s English-language films
1980s American films